Auxerre is the capital of the Yonne department and the fourth-largest city in Burgundy.  Auxerre's population today is about 35,000; the urban area (aire d'attraction) comprises roughly 113,000 inhabitants. Residents of Auxerre are referred to as Auxerrois.

Auxerre is a commercial and industrial centre, with industries including food production, woodworking and batteries.  It is also noted for its production of Burgundy wine, including Chablis.  In 1995 Auxerre was named "Town of Art and History".

Geography
Auxerre lies on the river Yonne and the Canal du Nivernais, about 150 km southeast of Paris and 120 km northwest of Dijon. The A6 autoroute (Paris–Lyon) passes northeast of the city. Auxerre-Saint-Gervais station has rail connections to Dijon, Paris, Corbigny and Avallon.

History

Auxerre was a flourishing Gallo-Roman centre, then called Autissiodorum, through which passed one of the main roads of the area, the Via Agrippa (1st century AD) which crossed the Yonne (Gallo-Roman Icauna) here. In the third century it became the seat of a bishop and a provincial capital of the Roman Empire. In the 5th century it received a cathedral. In the late 11th-early 12th century the existing communities were included inside a new line of walls built by the feudal counts of Auxerre.

Bourgeois activities accompanied the traditional land and wine cultivations starting from the twelfth century, and Auxerre developed into a commune with a Town Hall of its own. The Burgundian city, which became part of France under King Louis XI, suffered during the Hundred Years' War and the Wars of Religion. In 1567 it was captured by the Huguenots, and many of the Catholic edifices were damaged. The medieval ramparts were demolished in the 18th century.

In the 19th century numerous heavy infrastructures were built, including a railway station, a psychiatric hospital and the courts, and new quarters were developed on the right bank of the Yonne.

Until the early 20th century, Auxerre was one of the most prosperous cities in the department. But the local authorities of that period refused the railway that was subsequently set in the village of Migennes, and signed the economic decline of the town.

Population

Climate

Main sights

Cathedral of St. Étienne (11th–16th centuries). In Gothic style, it has three doorways with bas-reliefs. There are stained-glass windows in the choir and the apsidal chapel. The 11th-century crypt houses the remains of the former Romanesque cathedral.
Abbey of Saint-Germain, existing from the 9th century. The crypt has some of the oldest mural paintings in France, and houses the tomb of the bishops of Auxerre. There is a chapter room (12th century), a cellar (14th century) and a cloister (17th century).
The Clock Tower, in the Old Town
The church of St. Pierre en Vallée (17th–18th centuries), established over a 6th-century abbey. In late Gothic style, it has a tower similar to that of the cathedral. Portions of the decorations and inner chapels were financed by local winegrowers.
Church of St. Eusèbe, founded in the 7th century. The nave was rebuilt in the 13th century, while the tower is in Romanesque style.

Notable people 
Germanus of Auxerre (-), bishop of Auxerre, missionary to Britain
William of Auxerre (d.1231), early High Scholastic theologian from Auxerre
Jean Baptiste Joseph Fourier, (1768–1830), born in Auxerre, mathematician, experimental physicist, and politician
Paul Bert (1833–1886), born in Auxerre, physiologist and politician
Louis Amable Crapelet (1822–1867), born in Auxerre, water-colour painter
Théodore Frédéric Gaillardet, (1808–1882), born in Auxerre, journalist, publisher of French-language newspaper Courrier des Etats-Unis in New York City, mayor of Plessis-Bouchard, France
 Eugène Hatin (1809–1893), historian and bibliographer
Saint Helladius (d. 387), bishop of Auxerre
Paul Monceaux (1859–1941), born in Auxerre, historian
Benoît Mourlon (born 1988), footballer
Jean Paul Rappeneau (1932), born in Auxerre, film director.
 Guy Roux (1938), coach of AJ Auxerre for more than 40 years, holding the French record of 894 games in Ligue 1

Specialties
Gougère – baked choux pastry made of dough mixed with cheese.
Kir – a traditional aperitif mixed drink from Burgundy wine (traditionally Bourgogne Aligoté) and blackcurrant liqueur.
Boeuf bourguignon – a typical main dish made of beef and vegetables.
Truffe bourguignonne – truffles from Burgundy.

Regional wines 
Chablis wine: A white wine made exclusively of Chardonnay in the Chablis AOC
Saint-Bris AOC: The only white wine in Burgundy made of Sauvignon grapes, especially Sauvignon blanc and Sauvignon gris
Irancy: A red wine from the surrounding area made of Pinot noir
Bourgogne côte d'Auxerre: Belonging to the Burgundy AOC (wine), it is made of Chardonnay for the white wine and Pinot noir for the red.
Crémant de Bourgogne: Sparkling wine following the tradition of Champagne, Crémant de Bourgogne has a strong production in and around Auxerre.
Bourgogne Aligoté: Dry wine. Aligoté is the second most popular grape variety grown in Burgundy after Chardonnay.

The whole region of Burgundy produces over 200 million bottles per year.

Twin towns – sister cities

Auxerre is twinned with:

 Greve in Chianti, Italy
 Płock, Poland
 Redditch, England, United Kingdom
 Roscoff, France
 Saint-Amarin, France
 Worms, Germany

See also
 County of Auxerre
 Bishopric of Auxerre
 Cathédrale Saint-Étienne d'Auxerre
 Lady of Auxerre
 Saint Germanus of Auxerre
 Remigius of Auxerre
 William of Auxerre
 Communes of the Yonne department
 AJ Auxerre, the local football club

References

External links

Auxerre Town Hall 

Communes of Yonne
Prefectures in France
Gallia Lugdunensis
Burgundy